Panglung is a village in Sankhar village development committee Ward No-7, Syangja District, Gandaki Province, Nepal. The majority of its people are Brahmins. At the 2011 Nepal census, it had a population of 541, with 261 males and 280 females living in 46 households.

References

External links 
MeroSyangja.Com
District Development Committee, Syangja

Populated places in Syangja District
Syangja District